Arthur Dunn may refer to:

Arthur Dunn (1860–1902), English footballer and founder of Ludgrove School
Arthur William Dunn (1868–????), American educator

See also
Arthur Dunn Airpark, an airport in Brevard County, Florida